Sowing the Wind is an 1893 play by the British writer Sydney Grundy.

Film adaptations
In 1916 the play was turned into a British silent film Sowing the Wind. In 1921 an American version Sowing the Wind was also made.

References

Bibliography
 Goble, Alan. The Complete Index to Literary Sources in Film. Walter de Gruyter, 1999.

1893 plays
British plays adapted into films
Plays set in England
Plays by Sydney Grundy